The 1994 Hajj stampede resulted in the deaths of at least 270 pilgrims on 23 May 1994 during the Hajj in Mecca during the Stoning of the Devil ritual.

Event

Saudi officials said the stampede, which occurred at about 2pm local time, was caused by conditions "beyond human endurance", with a record 2.5 million pilgrims that year.  Some victims were reported to have fallen from a pedestrian overpass (the Jamaraat Bridge) as a wave of pilgrims crowded those already on the overpass.  After Saudi police sealed off the overpass, the crowds panicked and moved in two directions, causing more people to fall.  Ambulances could not reach the scene of the incident fast enough, which likely contributed to the death toll.

A Saudi statement on the incident blamed pilgrims who were rushing to throw their stones as causing the stampede.  The Saudis reported that 829 people died during the hajj, including 270 killed in the stampede, 536 who died from natural causes (which included sun stroke), and 23 from isolated incidents.  A Saudi official also noted that people get trampled every year.

One Saudi report stated that the victims included 182 Turks, and mostly Lebanese among the remainder.  Later reports suggested that most victims were Indonesian.

Subsequent measures

The Jamaraat Bridge (which still had a single tier at that time) was widened from 40 meters to 80 meters after the incident, though another large stampede occurred on the bridge four years later.

See also
Incidents during the Hajj
2015 Mina stampede

References

1994 in Saudi Arabia
20th century in Mecca
Disasters in religious buildings and structures
Incidents during the Hajj
Human stampedes in 1994
Human stampedes in Saudi Arabia
1994 disasters in Saudi Arabia